William Roland Kennedy (3 November 1899 – 2 October 1992) was a Canadian athlete. He competed in the men's high jump at the 1920 Summer Olympics.

References

1899 births
1992 deaths
Athletes (track and field) at the 1920 Summer Olympics
Canadian male high jumpers
Olympic track and field athletes of Canada
Place of birth missing